Surf-Bored Cat is a 1967 Tom and Jerry short directed by Abe Levitow and produced by Chuck Jones. Animation was by Dick Thompson, Philip Roman, Ben Washam, Hal Ambro, Don Towsley and Carl Bell, with layouts by Don Morgan and backgrounds by Philip DeGuard. The cartoon's title is play on the word "surfboard".

Plot
The title card and credits are first shown. As Tom and Jerry are on a cruise ship heading to a tropical Caribbean beach, Tom looks out the window seeing a surfer riding a wave. Tom leaps for joy, grabs his surfboard and takes off running, accidentally waking up Jerry who was snoozing on a deck chair. Tom tries to run with his surfboard out to the deck, but it jams in the door several times before he gets through. Then he takes a running leap, jumps onto his board, flying over the edge of the ship, and sails onto the pier. He shrugs, picks it up, takes off again and doing the same thing, lands on medium-sized boat, and again until he finally makes it to the sea out of a row boat. Tom then lands on a large blue ball, which turns out to be a shark. Tom peers over at the other of surfers and hits the shark in the head, knocking it out.

Tom surfs a large wave but spots the same shark below him, laughing demonically. Tom pulls himself up to the top of the wave but wipes out. He bursts out of the surface with the shark pursuing him. Tom speeds away from the angry shark, launching himself a foot into the air. He taunts the shark but scrapes the sand and runs into a rock. As a mound of sand covers him, the surfboard hits the rock, giving the mound the appearance of a grave. Jerry walks to the "grave", drops a flower onto it, and takes off his hat as a salute. Tom's hand then emerges from the grave and grabs Jerry before he sits up, the flower in his mouth, which he spits out. As Jerry laughs sheepishly, the sand on top of Tom's head falls away and reveals that a maroon starfish has latched onto his head.

The starfish suddenly enlarges one of its legs on Tom's nose and does an impression of Jimmy Durante. After that, Tom tries to get the starfish off of his head by tugging it off, but doesn't succeed, much to Jerry's amusement. Tom eventually gets the starfish off to his head, but it latches onto his hands. He tries to get the starfish off by pushing it with his foot. Tom succeeds, but he doesn't notice that the starfish is now stuck on his foot until he starts walking. He tries to pull the starfish off, but it latches onto his head again. Jerry whispers into Tom's ear a plan: run into the rock headfirst. Despite the starfish's protests, Tom carries out the plan and hits the rock with his head. Tom, noticing that the starfish is still on his head, starts crying while pointing at it and the rock. Just then, a bump forms on Tom's head, causing the starfish to jump off from Tom's head and run away, whistling and teasing happily as it departs.

Tom celebrates, until he notices that Jerry has stolen his surfboard. While the surfboard sails along, Jerry does a sombrero dance with his hat, puts the hat back on and poses one foot at the very front of the board. But Tom takes the surfboard and waves goodbye at the mouse. Jerry flies through the air and lands into a coconut tree. Jerry gets his head lodged in a coconut and acts like a monkey. Then, Tom paddles away but encounters the shark again. Tom jumps, slips, and skitters off his surfboard and swims to shore, causing the board to fly into the shark's mouth, and stick out of the end of his tail. As Tom laughs at the sight, but the board pops up out of the shark flies through the air and lands into Tom's mouth when he's laughing, causing him to swallow it, leaving him shaped like his surfboard. The shark laughs hysterically at Tom's predicament and departs. Oddly enough, Jerry takes "Surfboard Tom" out to ride the waves. At first, Tom looks irritated, but when he realizes he is doing what he has wanted to do all along, a reluctant grin comes over his face, and he and Jerry zoom along enjoying the wave and a beautiful sunset as the cartoon ended.

Crew
Animation: Dick Thompson, Philip Roman, Ben Washam, Hal Ambro, Don Towsley, and Carl Bell
Design consultant: Maurice Noble
Layouts: Don Morgan
Backgrounds: Philip DeGuard
Checker: Carole Barnes
Vocal effects: Mel Blanc, William Hanna, and June Foray
Production manager: Earl Jonas
Story: Bob Ogle
Music: Dean Elliott
Co-ordinator: Kathy Troxell
Production supervised by Les Goldman
Produced by Chuck Jones
Directed by Abe Levitow

External links

1967 short films
1967 animated films
1967 films
Films directed by Abe Levitow
Tom and Jerry short films
1960s American animated films
Animated films without speech
1967 comedy films
Films about sharks
Films scored by Dean Elliott
Metro-Goldwyn-Mayer short films
Metro-Goldwyn-Mayer animated short films
American surfing films
MGM Animation/Visual Arts short films
1960s English-language films